Vladimir Leonardovich Matetsky (born May 14, 1952, in Moscow) is a Russian and Soviet composer, producer, and radio presenter. Matetsky is a member of the Russian Authors' Society. He is married and has one daughter, Maria (born 1987) and son, Leonid (born 2001).

Matetsky started to take music classes under the direction of Sofija Moisseevna Karpilovskaya, a student of Elena Fabianovna Gnesina. Vladimir learned to play guitar just as piano. He was particularly influenced by The Beatles. At the end of the 1960s, Matetsky started to play in various rock bands, piano, guitar, bass-guitar. Around the same time he first started writing songs–unusually, in English rather than Russian.

His major success is considered to be the song  Lavanda in written for Sofia Rotaru and awarded a golden disc by Melodiya.

Currently he lives and works in Moscow.

Popular Songs
 "Lavanda" ("Лаванда") by Sofia Rotaru and Jaak Joala
 "Hutoryanka" ("Хуторянка") by Sofia Rotaru
 "Luna, luna" ("Луна, луна") by Sofia Rotaru
 "Bilo, No proshlo'" ("Было, но прошло") by Sofia Rotaru
 "Tolko etogo malo'" ("Только этого мало") by Sofia Rotaru
 "Lunnaya raduga'" ("Лунная радуга") by Sofia Rotaru
 "Dikie Lebedi'" ("Дикие лебеди") by Sofia Rotaru
 "Byla ne byla'" ("Была не была") by Sofia Rotaru
 "Tvoi pecialinie glaza'" ("Твои печальные глаза") by Sofia Rotaru
 "Nochnoi motilek'" ("Ночной мотылёк") by Sofia Rotaru
 "Zasentebrilo'" ("Засентябрило") by Sofia Rotaru
 "Net mne mesta v tvyom serdce'" ("Нет мне места в твоём сердце") by Sofia Rotaru
 "Bolsche ne vstrechu" ("Больше не встречу") by Alexander Barykin
 "Avtomobili" ("	Автомобили") by Vesiolie Rebiata
 "Pozovi menya v nochi" ("Позови меня в ночи") by Vlad Stashevsky
 "Malish" ("Малыш") by Danko
 "Zheltaya noch" ("Жёлтая ночь") by Vadim Kazachenko

References

External links
 http://www.silver.ru/air/authors/matetskiy/

1952 births
Living people
Musicians from Moscow
Soviet composers
Soviet male composers
Russian composers
Russian male composers
Russian songwriters
Soviet songwriters
Russian record producers
20th-century Russian male musicians